Imperial Diet means the highest representative assembly in an empire, notably:

 Imperial Diet (Holy Roman Empire), the general assembly of the Imperial Estates of the Holy Roman Empire (962–1806)
 National Diet, the current legislature of Japan (1889–)
 Imperial Diet (Austria), short-lived body that represented the non-Hungarian lands of the Austrian Empire (1848–1849)

See also
 Diet (assembly)
 Reichstag (disambiguation)

Legislatures